Edward "Ed" Atkinson (1851 – ?) was an American professional baseball player from Baltimore, Maryland.  He played two games in right field for the  Washington Blue Legs of the National Association of Professional Base Ball Players, and went hitless in eight at bats.

References

External links

1851 births
Year of death missing
Baseball players from Maryland
Major League Baseball right fielders
Washington Blue Legs players
19th-century baseball players